Cayo Norte, formerly West Key or North East Key is the largest privately owned island in Puerto Rico and is currently the property of SVI Investments, Inc. The island is located about 0.6 nautical mile (1.0 km) northeast of Culebra Island.  It lies 21 nautical miles (36 km) east of Puerto Rico and 12 nautical miles (20 km) west of St. Thomas, U.S. Virgin Islands.  The island is part of the municipality of Culebra and therein of the barrio San Isidro. It is the only privately owned island in the Culebra archipelago, and is not part of the Culebra National Wildlife Refuge as are most of the other nearby islands and keys.

Geography
Cayo Norte is the first island to starboard when traveling through the Virgin Passage from the Atlantic Ocean to the Caribbean Sea. It is somewhat oval in shape, with hills gently sloping to the sandy beaches on the south coast. The north coast is a rocky cliff. The hills on the eastern half of the island are mostly covered with bushes (croton rigidus). There are wooded zones along the south coast, in the valleys and on the western slopes.

History
In 1895, during the initial Spanish colonization of Culebra Island, title to Cayo Norte was ceded to José Morales and Francisco de los Santos. In 1902 title was conveyed to Leopoldo Padrón. Majority ownership of Cayo Norte stayed in the Padrón family until 2004. In 2006 100% ownership was acquired by SVI Investments, Inc., a family corporation, for use as a private retreat.  Cayo Norte is the only island in the Culebra archipelago that was not subject to bombardment by the U.S. Navy.  A study made for the U.S. Army Corps of Engineers in 2007 states that "Impact of Cayo Norte was planned [in 1924] but that difficulties clearing people and cows from the island kept it from being used for an impact area.  No UXO has been identified on Cayo Norte."

Wildlife
The U.S. Fish and Wildlife Service identified a beach on the southcoast of Cayo Norte as a critical habitat for two species of endangered sea turtles, the hawksbill sea turtle (Eretmochelys imbricata) and the green sea turtle (Chelonia mydas). There are no listed endangered species of fauna or flora in upland Cayo Norte.

References

Islands of Puerto Rico
Culebra, Puerto Rico
Private islands of the United States
Private islands of the Caribbean